Posëlok Imeni Kirova or Kirova may refer to:
Yeni Suraxanı, Azerbaijan
Kirov, Baku, Azerbaijan